Jack Ormondroyd (born 7 November 1991) is a professional rugby league footballer who plays as a  for the Salford Red Devils in the Betfred Super League.

He played for Featherstone Rovers in two separate spells in the Championship. Ormondroyd played for the Leeds Rhinos in the Super League, and on loan from Leeds at Featherstone in the Championship and the York City Knights in Betfred League 1.

Background
Ormondroyd was born in Birmingham, England. He is the son of English former professional footballer Ian Ormondroyd.

Career
He played in Australia for the Thirlmere Roosters in Group 6 Country Rugby League.

Ormondroyd then played for the Featherstone Rovers in the Kingstone Press Championship.

References

External links

Leeds Rhinos profile
Featherstone Rovers profile
SL profile

1991 births
Living people
English rugby league players
Featherstone Rovers players
Leeds Rhinos players
Rugby league props
Salford Red Devils players
Rugby league players from Birmingham, West Midlands
York City Knights players